Proekt, also known as Agentstvo, is an independent Russian media outlet specialising in investigative journalism.

History and activities 
Since 2001,  has worked for Gazeta.Ru, Forbes, Interfax, RBK and Dozhd as editor-in-chief. In 2017, he left to study journalism at Stanford University in California. In 2018, after graduating from his studies and returning to Russia, he decided to engage in investigative journalism in the format of an online media, which he had previously done. The project involved his colleagues at Dozhd (Maria Zholobova and Mikhail Rubin), as well as RBK. As of July 2018, Proekt had 10 employees and its initial budget was 500,000 dollars.

Proekt specializes in investigative journalism. The website of the media publishes text versions of the investigations, on the YouTube channel the media uploads short documentaries and podcasts. Proekt also posts materials on Telegram, VKontakte, Instagram, Yandex.Zen, Twitter and Facebook. Proekt exists at the expense of donations from its readers and sponsors.

Since 2019, after publications about the Russian paramilitary organisation Wagner, the journalists of the Project have been monitored by the Russian authorities.

In 2020, after The New York Times newspaper won International Reporting Prize, Proekt said that at least two articles in the winning entry repeated findings of Proekt's articles published a few months before without citing the source.

On June 28, 2021, Proekt announced that they would publish an investigation into the property of the relatives of Russian Interior Minister Vladimir Kolokoltsev. The next day, Moscow police raided apartments of Roman Badanin, deputy editor in chief Mikhail Rubin and co-founder of Proekt Maria Zholobova; the police also seized journalistic equipment. Officially, the searches were connected with a 2017 journalistic investigation about Putin's friend, businessman and crime boss . Natalia Zviagina, director of the Russian office of Amnesty International, said the raid is a "part of a systematic cleansing of any critical voices exposing the malpractices of those in power in the country".

On July 15, 2021, Russian authorities banned Proekt and labeled five of its journalists as "foreign agents". Proekt became the first news outlet that has been labeled as "undesirable organisation" in Russia. Badanin called the authorities' decision the best recognition. The head of Meduza's investigation department, said that the reason for the ban was Proekt's investigations into the top officials of the Kremlin. Russian journalist Andrey Kolesnikov said that the persecution of Proekt is a signal to the rest of the media: "See what we can and behave yourself."

Notable investigations 
The first investigations were devoted to different topics. Later, the publication began to post materials about secret connections and business activities of Russian officials and parties, corruption schemes of the highest echelons of the Russian government and big business, and the pressure and influence of the Russian government on the media and social networks. Investigations were released about people living in the Rublyovka prestigious residential area, the ties between Russian energy company Rosneft and Amaffi, the income of the head of Chechnya Ramzan Kadyrov and Russian official Adam Delimkhanov, as well as a special project "Iron Masks" dedicated to Russian president Vladimir Putin and his friends.

On 1 April 2022, Proekt published an investigation in which it found that Putin is often accompanied by a doctor specialising in thyroid cancer. The Kremlin's spokesman, Dmitry Peskov, denied that Putin had undergone surgery for thyroid cancer.

Awards 
In April 2019, Proekt's article "Master and Chef. How Russia interfered in elections in twenty countries" received Redkollegia award.

In November 2019, journalists of Proekt received "Journalism as a Profession" award in the category "Interview with Pictures" for an article "The Man Behind the Kremlin’s Control of the Russian Media".

In February 2020, Proekt's article "Highway to nowhere." received Redkollegia award.

In July 2020, Proekt's article "Brothers Ltd. How a Representative of a Top Chechen Leader ‘Solved’ Russian Business Disputes — And Walked Away With Millions" received Redkollegia award.

In August 2020, Proekt received the Free Media Awards for "its investigative research on corruption and abuse of power" from the German ZEIT-Stiftung and the Norwegian Fritt Ord.

References

External links 
 

Internet in Russian language
Internet properties established in 2018
Russian news websites
Russian-language websites
Free Media Awards winners
Bilingual newspapers
Undesirable organizations in Russia
English-language websites